= Maruthadi old lamptower =

The Maruthadi old Lighthouse (Marutthadi Valavilthoppu Old Lighthouse or the Maruthadi Lamp Tower) is a centuries-old maritime structure located along the coastal shores of Maruthadi in Kollam district, Kerala, India.

The structure was originally built by the Portuguese to act as a coastal beacon and guide passing cargo ships safely to the shore. Unlike the massive, modern towers seen today, this historic landmark is a four-metre-tall lamp tower. With the establishment of the Thanganserry lighthouse and the passage of time, the importance of the Marthadi lighthouse diminished. Due to decades of weathering and neglect, the century-old brick masonry tower is in a highly dilapidated condition and facing the risk of sudden collapse. Heritage lovers and local residents have frequently called on authorities to restore and protect this unique piece of Kollam's maritime history before it is lost completely.
